Bulgaria was a class 785/OL800  Russian river cruise ship (built in Komárno, Czechoslovakia) which operated in the Volga-Don basin. On 10 July 2011, Bulgaria sank in the Kuybyshev Reservoir of the Volga River near Syukeyevo, Kamsko-Ustyinsky District, Tatarstan, Russia, with 201 passengers and crew aboard when sailing from the town of Bolgar to the regional capital, Kazan. The catastrophe led to 122 confirmed deaths (bodies recovered and identified).

The sinking of Bulgaria was Russia's worst maritime disaster since 1986, when the  collided with a cargo ship and 423 people died.

Ship
Bulgaria was built at a Slovak shipyard in Komárno, Czechoslovakia, in 1955 as Ukraina, and was renamed Bulgaria in February 2010 after the Volga Bulgaria. She had two engines and two decks.

At the time of the sinking, Bulgaria was owned by Kamskoye Rechnoye Parokhodstvo, which leased the ship to OOO Briz, which in turn subleased it to OOO Argorechtur, which operated it, according to media reports, on a bareboat charter. This means OOO Argorechtur accepted sole liability for technical maintenance and crew placement. Investigators claim that Argorechtur was operating the cruise ship without a proper licence, and the company director was arrested on 12 July 2011.

Sinking
On 10 July 2011, Bulgaria was traveling in Tatarstan on the Volga River when she was caught in a storm and sank at about 13:58 Moscow time (09:58 UTC), several hours after beginning her cruise.

Survivors say that during the cruise, Bulgaria encountered stormy weather, and listed sharply to starboard. This was apparently compounded by the captain trying to turn the boat around, and soon water rushed into the vessel through portholes that had been opened because the ship had no air conditioning. According to a survivor, the sinking came without warning, and the vessel "listed to starboard ... and capsized and sank."

Casualties

At the time of the incident, Bulgarias total complement of passengers and crew is estimated to have been at 201, though she was only rated to carry 120.
On 11 July 2011, a government official from the Ministry of Emergency Situations said that the likelihood of finding additional survivors was slim, leaving a presumed total of up to 129 dead. On 12 July 2011, the divers recovered bodies of Bulgaria'''s captain Alexander Ostrovsky and his spouse. As of 25 July 2011, the officially confirmed death toll was 122, with all bodies found so far identified. Among the dead were believed to be at least 50 children.

Seventy-nine people (56 passengers and 23 crew members) were reported to have survived. Of those, 76 were rescued by the cruise ship Arabella, a few others were saved by other boats, and one swam to the shore.

 Passed ships 
According to survivors' accounts, two ships (the oil tanker Volgoneft-104 [other sources claim it could have been the Volgoneft-38] and the freighter Arbat) passed by after the Bulgaria had sunk. The passing ships did not stop to help and the ICRF launched an official investigation into these claims.

In accordance with Russian criminal code article 270, the captain of a ship that refuses to help in disaster could be sentenced to up to two years of deprivation of freedom. However, these ships, being heavy freight barges with minimal crews, were not technically capable of stopping while passing, nor of turning back in an acceptable time. The barge owners refused to comment. The technical reasons may not be sufficient to justify the refusal, as article 270 of the Russian criminal code allows the only reason to refuse help as when it could endanger a ship or its crew or passengers.Sinking people from Bulgaria were not seen well enough ... (in Russian) Assistance from the towboat Dunaisky 66, which was towing two barges, was refused by Arabellas captain who believed that the towboat would not have provided useful help and would only have hindered the rescue. Both Volgoneft-104 and Volgoneft-38 are equipped with life boats and, while coordinates are not precisely tracked, were in the region of the accident. Investigators did not charge captains of any oil tankers in relation to the Bulgaria disaster as of 15 July 2011; the only captains charged with failure to save are the captains of Arbat (Yuri Tuchin) and Dunaisky 66 (Alexander Egorov). These two ships seem also equipped with life boats.

On 28 February 2012, Alexander Egorov was found guilty by court. However, the court imposed only a relatively minor penalty of 190,000 RUB (less than 4,900 EUR). Egorov pleaded not guilty, claiming that entering the disaster area while towing barges would have hindered the rescue operation. He was considering filing an appeal.

 Salvage 

On 22 July with the help of two salvage cranes Bulgaria was partially lifted to the water surface. On 23 July she was moved to the nearby Gulf of Kirelsky, where her hold was sealed. On 25 July the bodies of the last two missing passengers were found in their cabins. On 26 July Bulgaria was moved to a floating dock for further disaster investigation.

Cause
On 11 July, an anonymous source close to the committee investigating the sinking said that the likely cause was portholes that were opened because of the lack of air conditioning on the vessel, which allowed water to enter Bulgaria when the captain attempted to turn the ship during stormy weather.

Evidence suggested that a number of safety violations could have caused or compounded the disaster. According to one survivor, emergency exit doors on the boat had been sealed or locked shut. Investigators also suggested that the boat set sail with a list to the right, possibly due to full sewage or fuel tanks on that side, and with one of its engines not properly functioning. According to investigators, sailing with a malfunctioning engine is a serious violation of passenger boat regulations. Some survivors told Russian news agencies that they begged the captain to turn around because of the list, but were ignored. There were conflicting reports about whether the boat and the cruise operator were properly licensed for passenger cruises. Survivors from the crew claimed that Bulgaria had lost electric power minutes before she sank, which effectively disabled ship controls, and prevented the crew from making a distress call over radio. For some unknown reason the emergency power did not come on. It was not until Arabella picked up the first survivors that authorities found out the name of the vessel and the true scale of the disaster.

While the ship was not licensed to carry the number of passengers that were on board, she probably was not technically overloaded as in the past she had been tested with as many as 2,000 passengers.

Government reaction

President Dmitry Medvedev on 11 July ordered "a complete check on all means of passenger transport" in Russia in response to the sinking of Bulgaria'', and also declared 12 July a national day of mourning for those killed in the incident.

See also

 Alexander Suvorov (ship)
 List of river cruise ships

References

External links

 Ministry of Emergency Situations
"A cruise ship has sunk in Volga River, as of 00.00 80 people were rescued."
"Search-and-rescue operation is continued on the site of sunk cruise ship in Kazan."
"As of 02.20 11.07.2007: lists of people on board of the sunk ship in the Rapublic of Tatarstan." (.DOC file)
"The situation emerged as a result of wreck of the cruise ship in the Republic of Tatarstan (as of 00.30 12.07.2011)."
"Divers have examined the most part of the middle and main decks of the Bulgaria."
"10.07.11 at 20:24 EMERCOM Ilyushin-76 plane left for Kazan."
"Preliminary list of rescued in the accident on the cruise ship “Bulgaria”. The lists are updated regularly."
"According to preliminary data 84 people have been rescued from 173 on board of the sunk ship in Volga River. One woman died."
 Ministry of Health and Social Development
 "Министр Татьяна Голикова доложила Президенту РФ о ситуации с пострадавшими в результате кораблекрушения в Татарстане и аварийной посадкой самолета АН-24 в Томской области." 

River cruise ships
1955 ships
2011 disasters in Russia
July 2011 events in Russia
History of Tatarstan
Maritime incidents in 2011
Maritime incidents in Russia
Ships built in Czechoslovakia
Ships of Russia
Passenger ships of the Soviet Union
Shipwrecks of Russia
Shipwrecks in rivers
Volga basin